Kristinn Benediktsson (born 5 May 1939) is an Icelandic alpine skier. He competed at the 1960, 1964 and the 1968 Winter Olympics.

References

1939 births
Living people
Kristinn Benediktsson
Kristinn Benediktsson
Alpine skiers at the 1960 Winter Olympics
Alpine skiers at the 1964 Winter Olympics
Alpine skiers at the 1968 Winter Olympics
20th-century Icelandic people